Thuggin' is the second  studio album by American rapper, Magic. It was released on August 31, 1999, on No Limit Records and Priority Records. Thuggin''' only found minor success compared to his previous album, peaking at  number 53 on the Billboard 200 and  number 9 on the Top R&B/Hip-Hop Albums. The 504 Boyz, which included Magic, remade Wobble Wobble for their hit single on the album Goodfellas'' a year later.

Video
One music video was shot for the dual single "That's Me"/"Ice on My Wrist" featuring Master P.

Track listing
"Beginning" – :52
"That's Me" – 4:30
"Ice on My Wrist  – 2:41 (featuring Master P)
"Party Time" – 2:07
"Wobble Wobble" – 4:03 (featuring C-Murder & Mac)
"Soldier" – 4:23  (featuring Suga Bear)
"9th Ward" – 3:57
"Premeditation" – :36 (featuring D.I.G.)
"Good Lookin' Out" – 4:25  (featuring D.I.G.)
"Do You Really Want Peace" – 3:39 (featuring C-Murder)
"Club Thang" – 4:30 (featuring C-Murder & QB)
"Puff Puff" – 4:34
"Thank You Lord for My Life" – 4:50 (featuring Mia X)
"Keep It Gangsta" – 4:34 (featuring Silkk the Shocker)
"Freaky" – 3:10 (featuring Ms. Peaches) 
"We Gon Ride" – 3:43 (featuring C-Murder)
"Wanna Get Away" – 3:42 (featuring Ms. Peaches)
"Thugs – 3:16 
"Ending" – 2:14

Chart positions

References

1999 albums
Magic (rapper) albums
No Limit Records albums
Priority Records albums